toio is an educational video game console developed by Sony Interactive Entertainment. It consists of two miniature robots, a docking station with a monochrome display, a cartridge port to load software onto, and two controllers. After shipping to crowdfunding backers in January 2018, the platform was released across Japan in March 2019.

Development

The product was conceived by Alexis André, based out of Sony Computer Science Laboratories' Tokyo division. It was unveiled at the Tokyo Toy Show and was put up for pre-order on Sony Corporation's First Flight crowdfunding platform in June 2017. Bandai, LEGO and Sony Music were announced as partners in development and content creation. In late 2017, Sony Interactive Entertainment took over the project as it offered a challenge beyond the television. Backers began receiving toio in January 2018.

Shortly after the project shifted to the gaming division, the hardware and software was significantly redesigned to improve stability. Sony offered the revised version of toio to those who crowdfunded the original at no additional cost. This version began being sold to the general public in Japan on March 20, 2019. Sony made the platform open source and released a GitHub repository on June 13, 2019. On September 30, 2020, Sony and Morikatron released a free Unity software development kit designed for toio.

Kits
Alongside the hardware itself, Sony has released a variety of themed kits that include game cartridges, additional toys for the robots and books with activities.

Reception

The platform and its games have won multiple Japanese Good Design Awards between 2017 and 2020. Papercraft Creatures - Gesundroid
made the Jury's Selection in the Entertainment category during the 22nd Japan Media Arts Festival in 2019. In 2020, the hardware won a Red Dot Design Award and an iF Product Design Award.

References

External links

Educational toys
Japan-only video game hardware
Sony consoles
Sony products
Products introduced in 2019
Sony Interactive Entertainment
2019 in video gaming